Chris Bagley (born May 20, 1980 in Weymouth, Massachusetts) is an American former soccer player.

Career

College and amateur
Bagley played club soccer for South Shore United and Boston Lightning, and played college soccer at Saint Anselm College, earning All-American honors twice as well as being voted Northeast Ten Conference player of the Year in both 2000 and 2001. 
Bagley played for the Decatur Football Club an amateur over-30 men's squad. (D.F.C.)

Professional
Bagley most recently played with USL First Division side Portland Timbers. He joined the Timbers in 2007 after 3 seasons with USL Second Division team Wilmington Hammerheads. He has also played for the MLS club New England Revolution as well as 3 seasons with the USL First Division Side Charleston Battery, winning the A-League Championship in 2003. Chris was also loaned to the Rochester Raging Rhinos of the USL First Division for 10 games in 2006 scoring 1 goal while being part of a team that lost to the Vancouver Whitecaps 3-0 in the USL First Division Championship game.

Bagley returned to the Hammerheads for the 2009 season, to act as a player and assistant coach.

Personal
Bagley wears the number 33 shirt because of one of his sporting idols, the NBA basketball player Larry Bird. His favorite hobbies include golf, the New England Patriots, and the Boston Red Sox.
Bagley, now retired, lives in Wilmington, NC with his family.

References

External links
 Wilmington Hammerheads bio

1980 births
Living people
American soccer players
Sportspeople from Weymouth, Massachusetts
Charleston Battery players
Association football forwards
Major League Soccer players
New England Revolution players
Portland Timbers (2001–2010) players
Rochester New York FC players
Soccer players from Massachusetts
USL First Division players
USL Championship players
USL Second Division players
Wilmington Hammerheads FC players
A-League (1995–2004) players
Saint Anselm College alumni